Err is the verb form of error.

Err, err or ERR may refer to:

Geography
 Err, Pyrénées-Orientales, a commune in the Pyrénées-Orientales department, France
 Errachidia Province, Morocco, by ISO 3166-2:MA code
 Piz d'Err, a mountain in the Albula Alps in Switzerland

Science and technology
 err, the ISO 639-1 alpha-2 code for the extinct Erre language
 err, a particular constructor in tagged union data structures
 Estrogen related receptor and particular members of the orphan nuclear receptor family:
ERRα
ERRβ
ERRγ
 European Romantic Review, a scholarly peer-review journal devoted to the interdisciplinary study of nineteenth-century culture

Other uses
 Edmonton Radial Railway, a former streetcar service in Edmonton, Alberta
 Eestimaa Rahvarinne, the Estonian Popular Front
 Eesti Rahvusringhääling, a radio and television organization in Estonia
 Einsatzstab Reichsleiter Rosenberg, a Nazi organization which appropriated cultural property during World War II
 Epsilon Rho Rho, a fictional fraternity in the "Mars University" episode of Futurama
 Era Alaska, a regional airline which uses the ICAO designation ERR
 Err, a fictional character in the animated comedy Aqua Teen Hunger Force
 Errol Airport, Errol, New Hampshire, by IATA designator

People with the surname
 Lydie Err (born 1949), a Luxembourgish politician

See also

 ER (disambiguation)
 Erro (disambiguation)
 Error (disambiguation)